Noemia is a genus of beetles in the family Disteniidae, containing the following species:

 Noemia apicalis Villiers, 1958
 Noemia apicicornis Ritsema, 1890
 Noemia bidentula Holzschuh, 2011
 Noemia brunnea Hudepohl, 1998
 Noemia conformis Holzschuh, 2011
 Noemia cupreoviridana Hayashi, 1977
 Noemia distincta Holzschuh, 2011
 Noemia euconna Holzschuh, 2011
 Noemia flavicornis Pascoe, 1857
 Noemia incompta Gressitt, 1935
 Noemia leiothorax Holzschuh, 2011
 Noemia luctuosa Holzschuh, 2015
 Noemia mindanaoensis Gressitt, 1935
 Noemia mindorana Vives, 2012
 Noemia negrosensis Aurivillius, 1927
 Noemia opacicollis Holzschuh, 2011
 Noemia resplendens Holzschuh, 2011
 Noemia rugulicollis Holzschuh, 2011
 Noemia semirufa Villiers, 1958
 Noemia sibuyanensis Aurivillius, 1927
 Noemia simplicicollis Pic, 1926
 Noemia stevensii Pascoe, 1857
 Noemia submetallica Gressitt, 1940
 Noemia virescens Schwarzer, 1927

References

Chrysomeloidea
Chrysomeloidea genera